Wild Orchid is the self-titled debut album by American group Wild Orchid, released on March 23, 1997. It is their most successful album. The album was nominated for 2 Lady Of Soul Awards.

Production
After signing a recording contract with RCA Records, the trio wrote and recorded songs throughout 1995 with the help of Renee's songwriter brother Bobby Sandstrom. The album took approximately nine months to complete.

Release and promotion
They released their debut single "At Night I Pray" on September 3, 1996, with the album due for an October 29, 1996 release. However, it was postponed and was released on March 23, 1997, in the midst of the popularity of their second single "Talk to Me".

The album debuted with its highest chart position in Billboards Top 200 Albums Chart at #153.

The album also received two Billboard Music Award nominations for "Talk to Me" and two Soul Train Lady of Soul Award nominations - one for Album of the Year By a Group, Band or Duo and one for Best Music Video for "Talk to Me". The group also received an American Music Award for Favorite R&B/Soul Artist.

Promotion
Wild Orchid spent 1996 and 1997 promoting their debut album. They made appearances on Soul Train, Ricki Lake, Access Hollywood, MTV, Wild On!, The RuPaul Show, 
Hard Copy, The HitList with Tarzan Dan, Vibe, Mad TV, The Pat Bullard Show, Caryl & Marilyn: Real Friends, Terry Bradshaw, Crook and Chase, The Jenny Jones Show, Electric Circus and Goode Behavior. The group even toured with 98 Degrees and 'N Sync across the U.S., Canada and Asia.

The singles "At Night I Pray", "Talk to Me" and "Supernatural" all garnered substantial radio airplay, all appearing on the Billboard Hot 100 Singles Chart.

Dance remixes of "Follow Me" and "I Won't Play the Fool" were released in May 1998 and became popular in underground clubs. The "I Won't Play the Fool" remix landed on the Top 10 Dance Remixes Chart of 1998 in Billboard magazine.

Track listing
"At Night I Pray" (Duran, Bobby Sandstrom, Wild Orchid) – 4:16
"Supernatural" (Evan Rogers, Carl Sturken, Wild Orchid) – 4:38
"I Won't Play the Fool" (Sylvia Bennett-Smith) – 4:26
"Talk to Me" (Antonina Armato, Junior Vasquez) – 4:48
"The River" (Bennett-Smith) – 4:28
"You Don't Own Me" (Ron Fair, Wild Orchid, Matthew Wilder)– 4:23
"My Tambourine" (Sandstrom, Wild Orchid) – 4:30
"Follow Me" (Bennett-Smith, Wild Orchid) – 4:15
"He's Alright" (Fabian Cook, Fair, Sandstrom, Wild Orchid) – 5:15
"Love Will Wait" (Clif Magness, Wild Orchid) – 4:05
"Life" (Fair, Stefanie Ridel) – 4:35

Personnel
Adapted from AllMusic.

 Sylvia Bennett-Smith – arranger, keyboard programming, producer, vocal arrangement
 Bob Brockman – mixing
 Luis Conte – percussion
 Fabian Cook – human beatbox
 Peter Doell – mixing
 Ron Fair – arranger, bass vocals, celeste, engineer, executive producer, guitar, harmonica, keyboards, producer, sound effects, vocal arrangement
 Fergie – producer, vocals, backing vocals
 Eric Fischer – engineer, guitar
 Steve Forman – percussion
 David Frank – arranger, assistant producer, Clavinet, Fender Rhodes, keyboard programming, organ, piano, producer
 John Goux – guitar
 Gary Grant – trumpet
 Jerry Hey – horn arrangements, trumpet
 Dan Higgins – horn
 Marc Hugenberger – programming
 Bashiri Johnson – percussion
 Teddy Kampel – rhythm guitar
 Abraham Laboriel – bass
 Lynette Lewis – toaster
 Pete Lorimer – arranger, drums, keyboards, loops, programming
 Al McKay – guitar
 Dennis Mitchell – engineer
 Joey Moskowitz – arranger, keyboard programming, rhythm arrangements
 Robbie Nevil – guitar
 Bill Reichenbach Jr. – trombone
 Stefanie Ridel – producer, vocals, backing vocals
 John "J.R." Robinson – drums
 Evan Rogers – arranger, producer, vocal arrangement
 Michael C. Ross – engineer
 Randee Saint Nicholas – photography
 Bobby Sandstrom – arranger, drum programming, keyboard programming, organ, producer, vocal arrangement
 Renee Sandstrom – producer, vocals, background vocals
 Robbes Stieglitz – mixing
 Carl Sturken – arranger, drum programming, guitar, keyboard programming, producer, vocal arrangement
 Junior Vasquez – producer
 Carlos Vega – drums
 Freddie "Ready Freddie" Washington – bass
 Wild Orchid – primary artist
 Matthew Wilder – arranger, drums, keyboards, loops, producer, programming, vocal arrangement
 Larry Williams – saxophone

ChartsAlbum - Billboard (United States)Singles''' - Billboard'' (United States)

Accolades
1997 Billboard Video Music Award Nomination : Best Dance/Club Clip Of The Year: Talk To Me
1997 Billboard Video Music Award Nomination : Best Dance/Club Clip (New Artist) : Talk To Me
1997 Lady Of Soul Award Nomination : Best R&B/Soul or Rap Album by Group Band Or Duo : Wild Orchid
1997 Lady Of Soul Award Nomination : Best R&B/Soul or Rap Music Video : Talk To Me

References

Wild Orchid (group) albums
1997 debut albums
Albums produced by Ron Fair
RCA Records albums